Robert William Radclyffe Dolling (1851–1902), often referred to as Father Dolling, was an Irish Anglo-Catholic priest who served mainly in London and Portsmouth.

Life
Dolling was born on 10 February 1851 in Magheralin, County Down, the son of Robert Dolling and Eliza (née Alexander). His father was a land agent. At the age of ten, he was sent to school at the Grange in Stevenage, Hertfordshire. In 1864, he went to Harrow School and then Trinity College, Cambridge, but left about a year later due to health problems. He lived abroad for a while, principally in Florence, but returned to Ireland upon the death of his mother in 1870, and assisted his father in the land agency work.

From 1878 to 1882 he was warden of one of the houses of the Postmen's League, started by Arthur Stanton of St Alban's, Holborn. He was ordained in 1883 to a curacy at Corscombe, Dorset, but resided in London as head of St Martin's Mission, Stepney.

In 1885 a difficulty as to the relation of his mission to Holy Trinity Parish, Stepney, led to his resignation, and he next accepted the charge of St Agatha's, Landport, the Winchester College mission. The reforms he accomplished there were described in his Ten Years in a Portsmouth Slum (London 1896). In 1895 he again resigned owing to the refusal of Randall Davidson, the new Bishop of Winchester, to grant him a licence to officiate at the parish's new church on account of his intention specially to associate a third altar with masses for the dead. During his time at the mission he spent a little over £50,000. Despite extensive fundraising when he resigned there was still an outstanding debt of £3,090, for which Dolling was responsible. He paid this off through sales of his book and further fundraising.

In 1897 Dolling visited the United States, where his preaching made an impression. He returned to the UK in the following year as vicar of St Saviour's, Poplar, and retained the living until his death in South Kensington, London, on 15 May 1902.

Bibliography

See also
 Alexander Mackonochie

References

Footnotes

Works cited

Further reading

External links
 

1851 births
1902 deaths
19th-century English Anglican priests
Anglo-Catholic clergy
Church of England priests
Anglican clergy from London
People educated at Harrow School
People from Magheralin